The Serie B 1950–51 was the nineteenth tournament of this competition played in Italy since its creation.

Teams
Seregno, Treviso, Ancona and Messina had been promoted from Serie C, while Bari and Venezia had been relegated from Serie A.

Events
A provisional fifth relegation was added to reduce the league.

Final classification

Results

References and sources
Almanacco Illustrato del Calcio - La Storia 1898-2004, Panini Edizioni, Modena, September 2005

See also
 1950–51 Serie A

Serie B seasons
2
Italy